This is the full discography for the Canadian rock musician Sam Roberts who is signed to Universal (Canada) since 2001. In 2000, Roberts recorded a set of demos entitled "Brother Down". Some of these songs appeared on later albums, including the song  "Brother Down" which appeared on Roberts' 2002 release "The Inhuman Condition" EP. The latter reached the charts in Canada. Since then Roberts has released six albums, four EPs and a number of singles.

Albums

Studio albums

EPs

Singles

Miscellaneous
These songs have not appeared on a studio album released by Roberts:

Music videos

References

Discographies of Canadian artists
Rock music discographies